Athlone  was a parliamentary constituency in Ireland, which from 1801 to 1885 returned one Member of Parliament (MP) to the House of Commons of the United Kingdom of Great Britain and Ireland.

History
Prior to 1801, the town of Athlone was a two-seat borough constituency in the Irish House of Commons. Under the Acts of Union 1800, which united the Kingdom of Ireland with the Kingdom of Great Britain to form the United Kingdom, the 33 most populous boroughs (including Athlone) continued to return MPs, but except for Dublin and Cork, they were reduced to one MP. Its first MP in 1801 was chosen by lot.

As was customary in Irish boroughs, created before the reforms of the nineteenth century, Athlone had an oligarchic constitution. The borough existed as a local government unit until it was abolished by the Municipal Corporations (Ireland) Act 1840, but the parliamentary borough was not affected by this change in administrative arrangements.

The style of the corporation was "The Sovereign, Bailiffs, Burgesses, and Freemen of the Town of Athlone". The officers were a sovereign, two bailiffs, thirteen burgesses (including the constable of the castle, who in 1837 was Viscount Castlemaine), a recorder, town-clerk, serjeant-at-mace, and billet-master; and there was a select body called the common council. The sovereign was elected by the common council from among the burgesses, annually on 29 June, and had the privilege of appointing a vice-sovereign with the approbation of the bailiffs and a majority of the burgesses. The bailiffs were elected from the freemen by the common council, on the same day as the sovereign, and were ex officio members of the council. The burgesses were elected for life from among the free men, and the freemen also for life, by the common council, of which body, according to the practice of the corporation, twelve had to be present to constitute an election. The common council were unlimited in number, but usually consisted of not more than twenty persons, including the sovereign and vice-sovereign and two bailiffs; they held their office for life, and vacancies were filled up by themselves from among the burgesses and freemen. The borough sent two representatives to the Irish parliament prior to the Union, after which it sent one to the Westminster parliament.

The right of election was vested in the burgesses and freemen. They numbered 71 in April 1831. By the Representation of the People (Ireland) Act 1832, the non-resident freemen (except those living within seven miles) were disfranchised and the right to vote was extended to the £10 householders. The registered electorate, in 1832, numbered 243.

Athlone ceased to have parliamentary representation under the Redistribution of Seats Act 1885, which took effect at the 1885 general election.

Boundaries
This constituency was the parliamentary borough of Athlone. When the borough was represented in the UK Parliament, it was partly in County Westmeath and partly within County Roscommon. Although the River Shannon which runs through the town forms the historic border between County Roscommon and County Westmeath, the Local Government (Ireland) Act 1898 included much of the town entirely in Westmeath, including areas west of the river.

Athlone was described (by Samuel Lewis in 1837) as "a borough, market and post-town, and an important military station, partly in the barony of Brawney, county of Westmeath, and province of Leinster, and partly in the barony of Athlone, county of Roscommon, and province of Connaught, 12 miles (N. E. by E.) from Ballinasloe, 15¼ (S.E.by S.) from Roscommon, and 59½ (W.) from Dublin ..."

Before 1832 the limit of the borough, under its charter, was a circle of a mile and a half radius from the centre of the bridge over the River Shannon, which waterway divided the town in two. However, for electoral purposes, those boundaries were diminished in 1832 and thereafter included only the town and a very small surrounding district, comprising 485 statute acres.

The boundaries of the parliamentary borough as set out in the Parliamentary Boundaries (Ireland) Act 1832 was:

Members of Parliament

Notes:
 a O'Connell was the candidate of a Liberal/Repealer pact.
 b Keogh belonged to a number of parties during his tenure. He was elected in 1847 as a Peelite and he was re-elected in 1852 as a Liberal pledged to form an independent opposition in Parliament. Shortly after the election he briefly joined the Independent Irish Party, but upon being appointed Solicitor-General for Ireland he was re-elected as a Liberal candidate in 1853. Until he was appointed a Judge, in 1856, Keogh remained a Liberal.

Elections

Elections in the 1880s

 Caused by Ennis' death.

Elections in the 1870s

 The original count for the 1874 election had both candidates receiving 140 votes. However, on petition, the poll was amended to the above figures.

Elections in the 1860s

Elections in the 1850s

 Caused by Keogh's resignation after being appointed a judge of the Court of Common Pleas

 Caused by Keogh's appointment as Attorney-General for Ireland

 Caused by Keogh's appointment as Solicitor-General for Ireland

Elections in the 1840s

 Caused by the previous election being declared void on petition. Originally, Farrell had been declared elected, with the poll amended to 110 votes for Farrell and 60 votes for Beresford, but a counter-petition was successful and a new writ was issued.

Elections in the 1830s

See also
Athlone, a town in County Westmeath, Ireland.
Athlone (Parliament of Ireland constituency)

Notes

References
The Parliaments of England by Henry Stooks Smith (1st edition published in three volumes 1844–50), 2nd edition edited (in one volume) by F.W.S. Craig (Political Reference Publications 1973)

External links

Part of the Library Ireland: Irish History and Culture website containing the text of A Topographical Directory of Ireland, by Samuel Lewis (a work published by S. Lewis & Co of London in 1837) including an article on Athlone

Westminster constituencies in County Westmeath (historic)
Westminster constituencies in County Roscommon (historic)
Constituencies of the Parliament of the United Kingdom established in 1801
Constituencies of the Parliament of the United Kingdom disestablished in 1885
Athlone